Nyctimenius tristis is a species of beetle in the family Cerambycidae. It was described by Johan Christian Fabricius in 1792,originally under the genus Saperda. It is known from Malaysia, Myanmar, India, Laos, the Philippines, Nepal, Thailand, China, Singapore, and Vietnam.

References

Lamiinae
Beetles described in 1792